2004 Continental Championships may refer to:

African Championships
 Multisport: 2004 African Cup of Nations

Asian Championships
 Football (soccer): 2004 AFC Asian Cup
 Football (soccer): 2004 AFC Champions League

European Championships
 Artistic gymnastics: 2004 European Women's Artistic Gymnastics Championships
 Figure skating: 2004 European Figure Skating Championships
 Football (soccer): 2003–04 UEFA Champions League
 Football (soccer): 2003–04 UEFA Cup
 Football (soccer): UEFA Euro 2004
 Football (soccer): 2003–04 UEFA Women's Cup
 Volleyball: 2004–05 CEV Champions League
 Volleyball: 2004–05 CEV Women's Champions League

Oceanian Championships
 Football (soccer): 2005 OFC Club Championship
 Swimming: 2004 Oceania Swimming Championships

Pan American Championships / North American Championships
 Football (soccer): 2004 CONCACAF Champions' Cup
 Gymnastics (artistic): 2004 Pan American Individual Event Artistic Gymnastics Championships
 Gymnastics (trampoline and tumbling): 2004 Pan American Trampoline and Tumbling Championships
 Judo: 2004 Pan American Judo Championships

South American Championships
 Football (soccer): 2004 Copa América

See also
 2004 World Championships (disambiguation)
 2004 World Junior Championships (disambiguation)
 2004 World Cup (disambiguation)
 Continental championship (disambiguation)

Continental championships